DN7 is a national road in Romania which links Bucharest with the Banat region, in western Romania, and further to the eastern European capitals Budapest and Belgrade via the border with Hungary at Nădlac. It is a high-traffic road and the preferred route for trucks. Near Râmnicu Vâlcea, the road crosses the Southern Carpathians along the Olt River, through the Valea Oltului touristic region.

Municipalities crossed by the road include Bucharest, Pitești, Râmnicu Vâlcea, Sibiu, Sebeș, Deva, and Arad, ending at the town of Nădlac. Between Tălmaciu and Sebeș, the national road and DN1 intersect.

The national road DN7 has two ramifications in Arad County. The first one is DN7B, which connects the national road to Turnu, where there is another border crossing with Hungary, whereas DN7G serves as the link between the road at Nădlac and the A1 motorway near the Nădlac II–Csanádpalota border crossing.

Most of the traffic formerly carried by the national road between Bucharest – Pitești and Sibiu – Nădlac now takes the A1 motorway, which will also carry most traffic between Pitești and Sibiu upon its completion.

See also
Transfăgărășan

References

External links

Roads in Romania